Constantine Doukas, Latinized as Ducas, was ruler of Thessaly from  to his death in 1303.

Life
Constantine Doukas was the second son of John I Doukas of Thessaly by his wife, who is only known by her monastic name Hypomone ("Patience"). He succeeded his father sometime in or before 1289 as ruler of Thessaly until his death in 1303. From  on he bore the title of sebastokrator. At the beginning of his reign, as he was underage, he stood under the regency of Anna Palaiologina Kantakouzene. His younger brother Theodore Angelos was his co-ruler until his own death in ca. 1299.

Early in his reign, Constantine's mother entered into negotiations with the Byzantine Empire and, in exchange for recognizing nominal Byzantine suzerainty, Constantine was invested with the title of sebastokratōr. Constantine continued his father's war against Nikephoros I Komnenos Doukas of Epirus and his Angevin allies. The campaign of 1295 resulted in Thessalian occupation of the fortresses that Nikephoros had designated as the dowry of his daughter Thamar Angelina Komnene when she married Philip I of Taranto, son of King Charles II of Naples and Maria of Hungary. Most of these conquests were lost to the Angevins in 1296, when a truce was signed. Further fighting followed in 1301, and Angelokastron in Aetolia-Acarnania had to be returned to Philip of Taranto. Virtually nothing else is known about the reign of Constantine, who died in 1303.

Family
His wife is unknown; Karl Hopf reported that she was called Anna Evagionissa, and that she outlived Constantine, dying in 1317. The couple had at least one child, John II Doukas, who succeeded as ruler of Thessaly.

References

Sources
 
 
 
 

13th-century births
1303 deaths
People from Thessaly
Medieval rulers of Thessaly
13th-century Byzantine people
Constantine
Sebastokrators
13th-century rulers in Europe
14th-century rulers in Europe
Ypati